The 1987 St Albans City and District Council election took place on 7 May 1987 to elect members of St Albans City and District Council in England. This was on the same day as other local elections.

Summary

Ward results

Ashley

Batchwood

Clarence

Cunningham

Harpenden East

 
 

 

No Green candidate as previous (4.4%).

Harpenden North

 
 

 

No Green candidate as previous (5.9%).

Harpenden South

Harpenden West

London Colney

 
 

 

No Independent Labour (22.8%) or Independent (6.6%) candidates as previous.

Marshallwick North

Marshallwick South

Park Street

Redbourn

Sandridge

 
 
 
 

 

No Independent candidate as previous (59.4%).

Sopwell

St. Peters

St. Stephens

 
 

 

No Independent candidate as previous (27.9%).

Verulam

 
 

 

No Independent candidate as previous (1.3%).

Wheathampstead

References

St Albans
St Albans City and District Council elections
1980s in Hertfordshire